I Will Follow You is the second single from the 2010 Schiller gold album Atemlos with vocals by Swedish singer Hen Ree (Rickard Olsén). The single was officially released on 11 June 2010 and did not chart. The single CD included a Magnet with the cover of the Atemlos album. The Remixes were released as a download single on 2 July 2010. The music video was shot in Berlin, Germany.

Track listing

Maxi single

Remixes (Download single) 
Released on 2 July 2010.

Credits 

 Music written and produced by Christopher von Deylen
 Artwork by Katja Stier

Music video 

The official music video for "I Will Follow You" was produced by Tribune Records and Jörg Kundinger Produktion and was shot in 2010 in Germany by German director Jörg Kundinger. Director of photography was Oliver Ackermann. The post production was made by GMP (Garnier Media Produktion). The video has a length of 3:41 minutes. The music video was shot in the German capital city Berlin. The video features alternately cityscape shots of Berlin and shots of different people from Berlin, which are sometimes singing to the lyrics of the song. One of the shown persons is the German actress Mila Böhning (* 2001). The shots of the city were made with the tilt–shift effect.

Some of the shown locations and buildings are the Oberbaum Bridge, the Strausberger Platz, the Marx-Engels-Forum, the Alexanderplatz, Unter den Linden, the Museum Island, the Rotes Rathaus and the O2 World.

References

External links
 Official music video of I Will Follow You
 The music video of I Will Follow You
 The single on Discogs
 Information at Universal Music

Schiller (band) songs
2010 singles
2010 songs
Island Records singles
Songs written by Christopher von Deylen